Railways in Nigeria consist of a 3,505 km Cape gauge national railway network and 669 km of standard gauge. The Cape gauge network is in poor condition  due to lack of maintenance. In 2019, the single operational standard gauge line from Abuja to Kaduna generated as much revenue as the entire Cape gauge railway network combined. The Nigerian government plans to extend the standard gauge to replace most of the Western Line, while the Eastern Line will be rehabilitated as a Cape gauge line. All trains in Nigeria are operated by the Nigerian Railway Corporation.

The Nigerian Railway Corporation recorded record revenues of 2.12 billion naira (approximately €4.664 million) in the first half of 2021, an increase of 31% over the same period in 2019, which recorded the previous record revenue. At the same time, revenue from freight transport was down, with gains coming mainly from passenger transport between Lagos and Ibadan on the new standard gauge.

Railway network

Cape gauge 

80% of the current Nigerian railways were originally built by the colonial power, Great Britain.  The railways were built to the  Cape gauge, the same track gauge used in most other British colonies in Africa.

The country has two major Cape gauge rail lines:

 The Eastern Line connects Port Harcourt in the Southeast to Maiduguri in the northeastern state of Borno, near the border with Chad.

There are also several branch lines:

 The Linking Line connects Kaduna on the Western Line to Kafanchan on the Eastern Line.
 Ifaw–Ilaro (Western Line), 
 Minna–Baro (Western Line), 
 Zaria–Kaura Namoda (Western Line), .
 Kuru–Jos (Eastern Line), 
 Baro-Kano Railway Station (Northern Line), .

The NRC network does not yet connect to the rail network of neighbouring states. However, in February 2021, construction began on a cape-gauge link from Kano to Maradi, the second-largest city in Niger, under the auspices of Portugal's Mota-Engil SGPS SA, with planned inauguration in 2023, which will be one of the first rail lines in Niger.

Standard gauge lines 
A standard gauge network is developing.

The oldest standard-gauge line is the original 217-kilometer line from Oturkpo to the Ajaokuta steel mill. An earlier standard gauge line of 51.5 kilometers operated between the Itakpe mines and the Ajaokuta steel mill. On September 29, 2020, an extension, the Warri-Itakpe Railway, was officially opened by President Muhammadu Buhari in a virtual ceremony. In 2018, employees of China Civil Engineering Construction working on the project had been attacked twice by "bandits." Passenger trains have been running on the standard gauge line since October 2020 and freight trains since April 2021. There are also plans for an extension here: from Ajaokuta to Abuja. This would give the line a length of 500 kilometers. Another planned line runs from Port Harcourt to Makurdi over a length of 463 kilometers.

Construction of the Abuja-Kaduna line by the Chinese construction company CCECC began in February 2011, and it was finally inaugurated on July 26, 2016. The total cost was US$870 million. The 186.5-kilometer line, which begins in Idu 20 kilometers west of central Abuja, requires two hours of travel time for trains with a maximum speed of 100 km/h. In August 2020, NRC reported that about 50% of the revenue of its entire rail network (about 4,000 km) would be generated by the standard gauge Abuja-Kaduna line (186 km). That Nigerians like to take the train between the capital Abuja and the next largest city Kaduna also has very serious reasons. Indeed, the "highway" between the two cities is a constant target for muggers. A train journey is thus the safer alternative to a car for residents of both cities. In 2019, a train traveller says, "I was kidnapped and now only travel by train!" Celebrities are also affected: As recently as November 20, 2021, Zamfara State governorship candidate Sagir Hamidu died in a robbery on the said Abuja-Kaduna Expressway. Train traveller Agatha Ameh says, "Although, I know some people who still travel by road, possibly because it’s cheaper, I will prefer the train services any day, any time. It’s safer, smoother, and even faster." She particularly praises the e-ticketing platform on the Abuja-Kaduna line.

The Lagos-Ibadan double-track line has been under construction by CCECC since March 2017 and was inaugurated at the new Lagos Central Station on June 10, 2021. It is 157 km long and passes through Abeokuta. It is the first double-track standard gauge line in West Africa. A Lagos-Ibadan journey takes two and a half hours, half as long as the equivalent car journey. All compartments (standard class, business class and first class) are air-conditioned and have three overhead screens. The window seats are equipped with power outlets and USB charging stations. Criticisms include the fact that tickets are not available online and only for cash payment, and that there are only three trips a day in each direction. There is praise for the punctuality and cleanliness of the trains. The Cape Gauge tracks, which continue to exist, are to be shared by the "Red Line" of the Lagos Light Rail, which is currently under construction.

Modern station buildings have been constructed along all new standard gauge lines. The new main station of Lagos, Mobolaji Johnson, for example, offers air-conditioned waiting rooms, handicapped access to the tracks, airport-like display boards of departure times, clean toilets, trained personnel for medical emergencies, etc.
The Nigerian government plans to replace most of the Western Line with the Lagos–Kano Standard Gauge Railway, which is being built in sections by the China Civil Engineering Construction Corporation.  Two sections have been completed and put into operation: Abuja–Kaduna and Lagos–Ibadan.

The Warri–Itakpe Railway connects the port city of Warri with Itakpe. It is fully operational for passenger and freight service, and construction is underway on an extension to Abuja.

762mm railways 
The  gauge Bauchi Light Railway operated between Zaria and Bukuru over a distance  and was opened in stages between 1912 and 1914. In 1927 the  section between Jos and Bukuru was converted to  becoming part of the Kafanchan to Jos branch line. The 2 ft 6in Zaria–Jos section continued to operate until 1957 when it was abandoned.

There was also the short-lived  gauge Wushishi Tramway which connected Wushishi with Zungeru in 1901 and which was extended in 1902 from Wushishi to Bari-Juko. It closed circa 1911 with its two Hunslet built 0-6-2T locomotives being transferred to the Bauchi Light Railway.

Mention must also be made of the Lagos Steam Tramway (1902) and the Lagos Sanitary Tramway (1906), both of  gauge.

History

Construction

The construction of railways in Nigeria started from Lagos Colony to Ibadan in March 1896, by the British government.

The Lagos Government Railway began operations in March 1901 and was extended to Minna in 1911, where it met the Baro–Kano Railway Station that was built by the government of Northern Nigeria between 1907 and 1911. The two lines were amalgamated in 1912 into the Government Department of Railways, the predecessor to the Nigerian Railway Corporation.  The railway reached its northeastern terminus of Nguru in 1930.

After coal was discovered at Udi, the Eastern Railway was built to Port Harcourt between 1913 and 1916.  This railway was extended to Kaduna via Kafanchan in 1927, connecting the Eastern Railway to the Lagos–Kano Railway. The Eastern Railway was extended to its northeastern terminus of Maiduguri between 1958 and 1964.

Decline

Years of neglect of both the rolling stock and the right-of-way have seriously reduced the capacity and utility of the system.  Couplings of the ABC kind, vacuum brakes and non-roller bearing plain axles are also obsolete.  By early 2013, the only operational segment of Nigeria's rail network was between Lagos and Kano. Passenger trains took 31 hours to complete the journey at an average speed of 45 km/h.

Rehabilitation

A project to restore Nigeria's railways has been underway since 2009.  The eastern line from Port Harcourt to Maiduguri was restored at a cost of 427 million by Lingo Nigeria, Eser West Africa, and the China Gezhouba Group.

In order to remedy the poor condition, efficiency, and profitability of the nation's railroads, the government is also seeking to privatize the Nigerian Railway Corporation.  Under the privatization plan, the railways will be split into three concessions, each to be awarded for a period of 25–30 years.

In 2019, the Cape gauge railways had only 15 functional locomotives. The 187 km Abuja–Kaduna line generated as much revenue in 2019 as the entire 3,505 km Cape gauge railway network combined.

Standard gauge network

In 2006, the government contracted with the China Civil Engineering Construction Corporation (CCECC) to build the Lagos–Kano Standard Gauge Railway. It was later decided to complete the project in segments due to a lack of funds. After many delays, the segment from Abuja to Kaduna (187 km) opened officially on 26 July 2016. The Lagos–Ibadan section began construction in March 2017 and was inaugurated on 10 June 2021. The third section will link Kano to Port Harcourt and Lagos.

The Warri–Itakpe Railway was begun in 1987 as Nigeria's first standard gauge railway, but it was finished in 2020 as the second standard gauge railway. The line was conceived as an industrial railway to supply the Ajaokuta Steel Mill with iron ore from Itakpe and metallurgical coal imported through the port of Warri. Although construction was originally planned to be completed in five years, sporadic funding stretched out the construction period over more than 30 years. In August 2017, the Minister of Transportation announced that the railway would be completed by the China Civil Engineering Construction Corporation and Julius Berger. On 29 September 2020, the Warri–Itakpe Railway was officially inaugurated by President Muhammadu Buhari in a virtual ceremony.  Construction is underway on an extension to Abuja, where it will connect with the Abuja–Kaduna section of the Lagos–Kano Standard Gauge Railway.

Metro systems

Several metro systems are active or under construction:

 Abuja Light Rail, opened in late 2017
 Lagos Rail Mass Transit
 Rivers Monorail in Port Harcourt         
 Calabar Monorail
 Kaduna State Light rail

Maps 
 UN Map

See also 
 Transport in Nigeria
 Railway stations in Nigeria

References

External links